John Milton Brannan (July 1, 1819 – December 16, 1892) was a career United States Army artillery officer who served in the Mexican–American War and as a Union brigadier general of volunteers in the American Civil War, in command of the Department of Key West in Florida and assigned to Fort Zachary Taylor. Most notably, he served as a division commander of the Union XIV Corps at the Battle of Chickamauga.

Brannan was scandalized by the highly publicized disappearance of his first wife, Eliza Crane Brannan, daughter of Colonel Ichabod Bennet Crane, in 1858; she mysteriously disappeared after taking a ferry from Staten Island to Lower Manhattan and was initially presumed to have committed suicide or been murdered, but it was later discovered that she had secretly fled to Europe and married another United States Army artillery officer, First Lieutenant Powell Wyman.

Early life and military career
Brannan was born in Washington, D.C., and was a messenger in the United States House of Representatives when he received his appointment to the United States Military Academy from Ratliff Boon, the U.S. representative from Indiana in 1837. His appointment was supported by 114 other Congressmen.

He graduated from West Point, ranked 23rd of 52 cadets in the Class of 1841, and was assigned to the 1st U.S. Artillery Regiment. Following graduation, Brannan served at Plattsburgh, New York, during the border dispute with Canada.

During the Mexican–American War, Brannan participated in skirmishing at La Hoya and the battles of Vera Cruz, Cerro Gordo, Contreras and Churubusco. He was brevetted to captain for gallantry for Contreras and Churubusco, and was severely wounded during the battle for Mexico City.

After the war with Mexico, Brannan served in Florida during the Third Seminole War. He remained in the American Southeast at various forts and posts from 1856 until the beginning of the Civil War.

Civil War service
At the outbreak of the Civil War, Brannan was appointed a brigadier general of volunteers and placed in command of the Department of Key West.

In October 1862, he fought in the Battle of Saint John's Bluff where he led infantry troops in the expedition on the St. Johns River against Confederate positions for control of Jacksonville, Florida. Also in the same month, Brannan was placed in command of the Department of the South (which at that time was co-terminus with the command of the X Corps) after Ormsby Mitchel's death. He was brevetted a lieutenant colonel for his service during the battle for Jacksonville, Florida. He served as department commander until January 1863.

In 1863, Brannan led an infantry division under Major General William Rosecrans in the Tullahoma Campaign where he fought at Hoover's Gap. He then fought under Maj. Gen. George Henry Thomas during the Chickamauga Campaign in the XIV Corps. At the Battle of Chickamauga, Brannan's division was heavily engaged and he subsequently lost 38 percent of his command. Nevertheless, he was awarded a Regular Army brevet promotion to colonel for meritorious service.

When Rosecrans was relieved by Ulysses S. Grant, Brannan was reassigned from infantry back to artillery. He was promoted to the rank of major in the Regular Army in August 1863.

From October 1863 until June 1865, Brannan was chief of artillery of the Department of the Cumberland, where he oversaw the defenses at Chattanooga. He served in the Battle of Missionary Ridge and in the Atlanta Campaign, where he participated in the Battle of Resaca, the Battle of Dallas and the Battle of Kennesaw Mountain. He was also present at the siege and surrender of Atlanta. He was promoted to brevet major general in both the Regular Army and in the volunteer forces for gallant and meritorious services in the Atlanta Campaign and in the field during the Rebellion."

From July 10 to September 25, 1865, Brannan was in command of the District of Savannah and the 1st Division, Department of Georgia, and of the District of Savannah from October 5 to December 19, 1865, and of the Department of Georgia from December 19, 1865 to May 31, 1866.

Postbellum career
thumb|Portrait
After the Civil War, Brannan mustered out of the volunteer forces and reverted to the Regular Army rank of major with the 1st U.S. Artillery Regiment. He was assigned to artillery duties at Fort Trumbull, Connecticut, Fort Wadsworth, New York, and Ogdensburg, New York.

While posted at Ogdensburg, he was part of the U.S. Army's response to the Fenian raids into Canada, and in 1877, he was in Philadelphia, Pennsylvania during the railroad riots.

Brannan transferred to the 4th U.S. Artillery Regiment in 1877. He retired from the U.S. Army with the rank of colonel on April 19, 1882, and moved to New York City.

Brannan was a member of the Military Order of the Loyal Legion of the United States.

Brannan died in New York and was buried at Woodlawn Cemetery, later reinterred at the West Point Cemetery.

An Endicott Era coast artillery mortar battery at Fort Worden was named after Brannan in 1904.

Personal life

Disappearance of Eliza Brannan 
Brannan was married to Eliza Crane, daughter of Colonel Ichabod Bennet Crane (colonel of the 1st U.S. Artillery), on September 16, 1850.

While Brannan was posted in Key West, Florida from 1856, his wife lived in Staten Island with her young daughter and mother.

On July 20, 1858, Eliza Brannan disappeared while she was out shopping in New York City. After days of searching for the missing woman, it was believed by officials that she was dead. Captain Brannan himself reportedly feared she had committed suicide in a moment of temporary insanity. In 1860, however, Eliza Brannan contacted her brother (Dr. Charles Crane) and notified him that she was, in fact, alive: having originally fled to Italy, she was now remarried and living in Paris, France. Dr. Crane notified Captain Brannan of the news that his wife still lived.

Brannan soon learned that the man who Eliza had remarried was Powell Tremlett Wyman. A career artillery officer of the 1st U.S. Artillery regiment, Wyman met Mrs. Brannan through a mutual acquaintance and the two corresponded after her flight to Europe. In 1860, First Lieutenant Wyman was denied a leave of absence to visit his lover, and instead resigned his commission and traveled to Italy to join (and later marry) Eliza Brannan. At some point between 1860 and 1862, Wyman and Eliza Brannan returned to the United States, where they lived openly as a married couple.

With the advent of the American Civil War, the matter was set aside: John Brannan remained in Key West throughout 1860 and the first half of 1861, soon accepting a commission as a brigadier general of volunteers and engaged in action throughout the duration of the war. Meanwhile, Powell Wyman accepted a volunteer commission as colonel of the 16th Massachusetts Infantry in August 1861, and he was killed in action in June 1862 at the Battle of Glendale.

John Brannan never reconciled with his wife; he obtained a decree of divorce in 1863, and remarried in 1870.

See also

 List of American Civil War generals (Union)

Notes

References
 Eicher, John H., and David J. Eicher. Civil War High Commands. Stanford, CA: Stanford University Press, 2001. .
 Hubbell, John T., James W. Geary, and Jon L. Wakelyn, eds. Biographical Dictionary of the Union: Northern Leaders of the Civil War. Westport, CT: Greenwood Press, 1995. .
 Johnson, Rossiter, and John Howard Brown, eds. The Twentieth Century Biographical Dictionary of Notable Americans. 10 vols. Boston: The Biographical Society, 1904. .
 Warner, Ezra J. Generals in Blue: Lives of the Union Commanders. Baton Rouge: Louisiana State University Press, 1964. .
 Wilson, James Grant, and John Fiske, eds. Appletons' Cyclopaedia of American Biography. 6 vols. New York: D. Appleton and Co, 1887. .

External links
 
 

1819 births
1892 deaths
United States Military Academy alumni
American military personnel of the Mexican–American War
Members of the Aztec Club of 1847
Union Army generals
People of the Fenian raids
People of Washington, D.C., in the American Civil War
Burials at West Point Cemetery
Crane family of New Jersey